John Darrell (born 1562 in or near Mansfield, Nottinghamshire, England, died after 1602) was an Anglican clergyman noted for his Puritan views and his practice as an exorcist, which led to imprisonment.

Exorcist
Darrell was a sizar of Queens' College, Cambridge. In 1586 he exorcised a girl in Derbyshire, and published an account of his work. In 1596–1597 he conducted further exorcisms, mainly at St Mary's Church, Nottingham, where he was appointed curate by Robert Aldridge, but also in Lancashire, where with others he exorcised demons from seven members of the household of Nicholas Starkey in Tyldesley on 17 and 18 March 1597, and in Staffordshire. Many were sceptical about these cases, especially when Darrell claimed he knew of 13 witches in the town.

Prosecution
Because of the intense public interest and the fierce arguments in Nottingham, John Whitgift, Archbishop of Canterbury, ordered an investigation. As a result, Darrell was accused of fraudulent exorcism. The prosecutor was Samuel Harsnett, who was to end his career as Archbishop of York. Harsnett's views about Darrell were published in A Declaration of Egregious Popish Impostures in 1603. Shakespeare read it, and King Lear contains the names of devils, like Flibbertigibbet and Smulkin, taken from Darrell's book. Darrell himself maintained that there was no fraud in his activities. What he wanted to prove was that Puritans were as capable as Roman Catholics in the matter of dispossessing evil spirits.

Darrell was deprived of holy orders and sent to prison, but released in 1599.

See also
Puritan exorcism

References

Further reading
Benjamin Brook, The lives of the Puritans: containing a biographical account of those divines who distinguished themselves in the cause of religious liberty, from the reformation under Queen Elizabeth, to the Act of uniformity in 1662, Volume 2, J. Black, 1813, pp. 117–122.
Marion Gibson, Possession, Puritanism and Print: Darrell, Harsnett, Shakespeare and the Elizabethan Exorcism Controversy, London: Pickering and Chatto, 2006, 
Peter Lake and Michael C. Questier, Conformity and orthodoxy in the English church 1560-1660, Boydell & Brewer, 2000, chap.2
Diane Purkiss, The witch in history: early modern and twentieth-century representations, Routledge, 1996, p. 189
Corinne Holt Sawyer (1962). The case of John Darrell. Minister and Exorcist. University of Florida Press.
J. A. Sharpe, The bewitching of Anne Gunter: a horrible and true story of deception, witchcraft, murder, and the King of England, Taylor & Francis, 2000, p. 148
Keith Thomas, Religion and the Decline of Magic (Penguin Books: Harmondsworth, Middlesex, 1973 [1971]), pp. 576–580 and passim
Brendan C. Walsh, The English Exorcist: John Darrell and the Shaping of Early Modern English Protestant Demonology, New York; NY: Routledge, 2021,  

1562 births
Alumni of Queens' College, Cambridge
Year of death missing
16th-century English Puritan ministers
British exorcists